Irene is a 2002 French drama film directed by Ivan Calbérac.

Cast 
 Cécile de France - Irène
 Bruno Putzulu - François
 Olivier Sitruk - Luca
 Estelle Larrivaz - Sophie
 Agathe de La Boulaye - Salomé
 Patrick Chesnais - Gazet

References

External links 

2002 drama films
2002 films
French drama films
2000s French films